The 1957 Michigan State Spartans football team represented Michigan State University in the 1957 Big Ten Conference football season. In their fourth season under head coach Duffy Daugherty, the Spartans compiled an 8–1 overall record (5–1 against Big Ten opponents), finished in second place in the Big Ten Conference, and were ranked No. 3 in both the final AP Poll and the final Coaches Poll. Michigan State was named national champion by Dunkel System, an NCAA-designated major selector.

Six Spartans were selected as first-team players on the 1957 All-Big Ten Conference football team: quarterback Jim Ninowski (AP-1, UP-1); fullback Walt Kowalczyk (AP-1, UP-1); center Dan Currie (AP-1, UP-1); tackle Pat Burke (AP-1, UP-1); end Sam Williams (UP-1); and guard Ellison Kelly (UP-1).

The 1957 Spartans won all three of their annual rivalry games. In the annual Indiana–Michigan State football rivalry game, the Spartans defeated the Hoosiers by a 54 to 0 score. In the Notre Dame rivalry game, the Spartans defeated the Fighting Irish by a 34 to 6 score. And, in the annual Michigan–Michigan State football rivalry game, the Spartans defeated the Wolverines by a 35 to 6 score.

In non-conference play, the Spartans also defeated California, 19–0, and Kansas State, 27–9.

Schedule

References

Michigan State
Michigan State Spartans football seasons
Michigan State Spartans football